The 2011 season was Chunnam Dragons's seventeenth season in the K-League in South Korea. Chunnam Dragons competed in K-League, League Cup and Korean FA Cup.

Current squad

Match results

K-League

League table

Results summary

Results by round

Korean FA Cup

League Cup

Squad statistics

Appearances and goals
Statistics accurate as of match played 30 October 2011

Top scorers

Top assistors

Discipline

Transfer

In

Out
30 June 2011 –  Ji Dong-Won – Sunderland A.F.C.
7 July 2011 –  Kim Hyung-Ho – Released (under arrest)
7 July 2011 –  Song Jung-Hyun – Released (under arrest)
7 July 2011 –  Jung Yoon-Sung – Released (under arrest)
 7 July 2011 –  Baek Seung-Min – Released (under indictment)
 July 2011 –  Nam Joon-Jae – Jeju United FC

References

South Korean football clubs 2011 season
Jeonnam Dragons seasons